The hobby of collecting includes seeking, locating, acquiring, organizing, cataloging, displaying, storing, and maintaining items that are of interest to an individual collector. Collections differ in a wide variety of respects, most obviously in the nature and scope of the objects contained, but also in purpose, presentation, and so forth. The range of possible subjects for a collection is practically unlimited, and collectors have realised a vast number of these possibilities in practice, although some are much more popular than others.

In collections of manufactured items, the objects may be antique or simply collectable. Antiques are collectable items at least 100 years old, while other collectables are arbitrarily recent. The word vintage describes relatively old collectables that are not yet antiques.

Collecting is a childhood hobby for some people, but for others a lifelong pursuit or something started in adulthood. Collectors who begin early in life often modify their aims when they get older. Some novice collectors start purchasing items that appeal to them then slowly work at learning how to build a collection, while others prefer to develop some background in the field before starting to buy items. The emergence of the internet as a global forum for different collectors has resulted in many isolated enthusiasts finding each other.

Types of collection

The most obvious way to categorize collections is by the type of objects collected. Most collections are of manufactured commercial items, but natural objects such as birds' eggs, butterflies, rocks, and seashells can also be the subject of a collection. For some collectors, the criterion for inclusion might not be the type of object but some incidental property such as the identity of its original owner.

Some collectors are generalists with very broad criteria for inclusion, while others focus on a subtopic within their area of interest. Some collectors accumulate arbitrarily many objects that meet the thematic and quality requirements of their collection, others—called completists or completionists—aim to acquire all items in a well-defined set that can in principle be completed, and others seek a limited number of items per category (e.g. one representative item per year of manufacture or place of purchase). Collecting items by country (e.g. one collectible per country) is very common. The monetary value of objects is important to some collectors but irrelevant to others. Some collectors maintain objects in pristine condition, while others use the items they collect.

Value of collected items

After a collectable has been purchased, its retail price no longer applies and its value is linked to what is called the secondary market. There is no secondary market for an item unless someone is willing to buy it, and an object's value is whatever the buyer is willing to pay. Depending on age, condition, supply, demand, and other factors, individuals, auctioneers, and secondary retailers may sell a collectable for either more or less than what they originally paid for it. Special or limited edition collectables are created with the goal of increasing demand and value of an item due to its rarity. A price guide is a resource such as a book or website that lists typical selling prices.

Products often become more valuable with age. The term antique generally refers to manufactured items made over 100 years ago, although in some fields, such as antique cars, the time frame is less stringent. For antique furniture, the limit has traditionally been set in the 1830s. Collectors and dealers may use the word vintage to describe older collectables that are too young to be called antiques, including Art Deco and Art Nouveau items, Carnival and Depression glass, etc. Items which were once everyday objects but may now be collectable, as almost all examples produced have been destroyed or discarded, are called ephemera.

Psychological aspects

Psychological factors can play a role in both the motivation for keeping a collection and the impact it has on the collector's life. These factors can be positive or negative.

The hobby of collecting often goes hand-in-hand with an interest in the objects collected and what they represent, for example collecting postcards may reflect an interest in different places and cultures. For this reason, collecting can have educational benefits, and some collectors even become experts in their field.

Maintaining a collection can be a relaxing activity that counteracts the stress of life, while providing a purposeful pursuit which prevents boredom. The hobby can lead to social connections between people with similar interests and the development of new friendships. It has also been shown to be particularly common among academics.

Collecting for most people is a choice, but for some it can be a compulsion, sharing characteristics with obsessive hoarding. When collecting is passed between generations, it might sometimes be that children have inherited symptoms of obsessive–compulsive disorder. Collecting can sometimes reflect a fear of scarcity, or of discarding something and then later regretting it.

Carl Jung speculated that the widespread appeal of collecting is connected to the hunting and gathering that was once necessary for human survival. Collecting is also associated with memory by association and the need for the human brain to catalogue and organise information and give meaning to ones actions.

History

Collecting is a practice with a very old cultural history. In Mesopotamia, collecting practices have been noted among royalty and elites as far back as the 3rd millennium BCE. The Egyptian Ptolemaic dynasty collected books from all over the known world at the Library of Alexandria. The Medici family, in Renaissance Florence, made the first effort to collect art by private patronage, this way artists could be free for the first time from the money given by the Church and Kings; this citizenship tradition continues today with the work of private art collectors. Many of the world's popular museums—from the Metropolitan in New York City to the Thyssen in Madrid or the Franz Mayer in Mexico City—have collections formed by the collectors that donated them to be seen by the general public.

The collecting hobby is a modern descendant of the "cabinet of curiosities" which was common among scholars with the means and opportunities to acquire unusual items from the 16th century onwards. Planned collecting of ephemeral publications goes back at least to George Thomason in the reign of Charles I and Samuel Pepys in that of Charles II. Collecting engravings and other prints by those whose means did not allow them to buy original works of art also goes back many centuries. The progress in 18th-century Paris of collecting both works of art and of curiosité, dimly echoed in the English curios, and the origins in Paris, Amsterdam and London of the modern art market have been increasingly well documented and studied since the mid-19th century.

The involvement of larger numbers of people in collecting activities came with the prosperity and increased leisure for some in the later 19th century in industrial countries. That was when collecting such items as antique china, furniture and decorative items from oriental countries became established. The first price guide was the Stanley Gibbons catalogue issued in November 1865.

On the Internet

The Internet offers many resources to any collector: personal sites presenting one's collection, tools for tracking conditions and number of items collected, item identification tools, pricing guides, online collectable catalogs, online marketplaces, trading platforms, collector clubs, autograph clubs, collector forums, and collector mailing lists.

Some of the most popular collecting websites are StampWorld, Delcampe, and Numista.

Some of the most spread collectables online are stamps and coins.

Notable collectors 

Alfred Chester Beatty — various collections
Barry Halper — baseball memorabilia
Bella Clara Landauer — various, primarily ephemera
Charles Wesley Powell — orchids
Demi Moore — dolls
Donald Kaufman — antique toys
Forrest J Ackerman — books and movie memorabilia
Geddy Lee — bass guitars
George Gustav Heye — Native American artifacts
George Weare Braikenridge — primarily art of Bristol
Hans Sachs — posters
Hans Sloane — natural history
Harvey H. Nininger — meteorites
Henry Wellcome — medical objects
James Allen — antiques and photographs
Joaquín Rubio y Muñoz — antique coins
J. P. Morgan — various, primarily gems
Kenneth W. Rendell — historical documents, primarily World War II
King George V — stamps
Magnus Walker — Porsches
Margaret Bentinck, Duchess of Portland — primarily natural history
Philipp von Ferrary — stamps and coins
Raleigh DeGeer Amyx — historical memorabilia
Sam Wagstaff — various collections
Tim Rowett — children's toys and novelties
Tom Hanks — typewriters
William Dixson — primarily Australiana

See also
 Antique toy show
 Collectable
 Ephemera
 Hoarding
 Scientific collection
 :Category:Collectors

Bibliography
Blom, Philipp (2005) To Have and To Hold: an intimate History of collectors and collecting. 
 Castruccio, Enrico (2008) "I Collezionisti: usi, costumi, emozioni". Cremona: Persico Edizioni 
 Chaney, Edward, ed. (2003) The Evolution of English Collecting. New Haven: Yale University Press
Schulz, Charles M. (1984) Charlie Brown's Super Book of Things to Do and Collect: based on the Charles M. Schulz characters. New York: Random House, 1984, paperback, (hardcover in library binding )
 Redman, Samuel J. (2016) Bone Rooms: From Scientific Racism to Human Prehistory in Museums. Cambridge: Harvard University Press 
 Shamash, Jack, (2013) George V's Obsession – a King and His Stamps
 Shamash, Jack (2014) The Sociology of Collecting
 Thomason, Alison Karmel (2005) Luxury and Legitimation: Royal Collecting in Ancient Mesopotamia. Hampshire, U.K.: Ashgate Publishing Limited.
 van der Grijp, Paul (2006) Passion and Profit: Towards an Anthropology of Collecting. Berlin: LIT Verlag.

Notes and references

External links

 Journal of the History of Collections (archived 12 April 2009)
 Center for the History of Collecting at the Frick Collection (Art collecting) (archived 6 February 2009)
 "Amass Appeal" Essay by Richard Rubin, AARP Magazine, March/April 2008 (archived 7 September 2012).
Mueller, Shirley M. (2019). Inside the Head of a Collector : Neuropsychological Forces at Play. Seattle. . OCLC 1083575943.

 
Collections care
Museology
Museum collections
Lifestyles